Leman is a surname. Notable people with the surname include:

Albert Leman (1915–1998), Russian composer
Ben Leman, member of Texas House of Representatives from district 13
Bob Leman (1922–2006), American science fiction and horror author
Dennis Leman, English footballer
Gérard Leman (1851–1920), Belgian general
Jeremy Leman (born 1985), known as J. Leman, American football linebacker
John Leman (died 1632), English tradesman
Jules Leman (1826–1880), French priest and schoolmaster 
Kevin Leman, American psychologist and author
Loren Leman (born 1950), American politician
Martin Leman (born 1934), British artist
Richard Leman (born 1959), English field hockey player
Robert Leman, (1799-1869), English artist
Ulrich Leman (1885–1988), German painter

See also
Lehman (surname)
Lehmann

Surnames of French origin